Erik Hivju (born 24 September 1947) is a Norwegian actor.  Hivju has appeared in more than a dozen television series, as well as several films. He is the father of the Norwegian actor Kristofer Hivju.

Selected filmography
 Lukket avdeling (1972)
 Operasjon Cobra (1978)
 Little Ida (1981)
 Krypskyttere (1982)
 The King's Choice (2016)

Dubbing
 The Black Cauldron - The Horned King
 A Bug's Life - Hopper
 Tarzan - Kerchak

External links
 

Norwegian male television actors
1947 births
Living people
Norwegian male film actors
20th-century Norwegian male actors